There are many references to trams in popular culture. Major references include:

Ballet
 The drama, A Streetcar Named Desire was the basis of a 1993 ballet.

Drama

 A Streetcar Named Desire was written by Tennessee Williams in 1947. The same play was also made into multiple films (see below), and a ballet in 1993 (see "Ballet" section). It was also the theme of a 1995 opera (see "Opera" section).

Film
 Trams are the leitmotif of Walther Ruttman's 1927 film Berlin – die Sinfonie der Großstadt.
 Alfred Hitchcock (1899-1980) was a well-known rail enthusiast with a particular interest in London trams. An overwhelming majority of his films include rail or tram scenes, in particular The Lady Vanishes, Strangers on a Train and Number Seventeen. A clapperboard shows the number of the scene and the number of takes, and Hitchcock would often take the two numbers on the clapperboard and whisper the London tram route numbers. For example, if the clapperboard showed Scene 23; Take 3; Hitchcock would whisper "Woodford, Hampstead" - Woodford being the terminus of the route 23 tram, and Hampstead the end of route 3.
 There have been three film versions of A Streetcar Named Desire: in 1951, in 1984 and in 1995
 Black Orpheus (1959), has a lead character, Orfeu, who is a tram driver on Rio de Janeiro's tram system.
 The central plot of the film Who Framed Roger Rabbit involves Judge Doom, the villain, dismantling the streetcars of Los Angeles.
 Malcolm is an Australian film about a tram enthusiast (Colin Friels) who uses his inventions to pull off a bank heist. There are many scenes of Melbourne trams, as well as models of Melbourne and Adelaide trams, and (at the end of the film) scenes showing Lisbon trams.
  Another film set in Melbourne is Alvin Purple, starring Graeme Blundell in the title role. Alvin is a man who appears to think of nothing but sex and who, in turn, is particularly attractive to virtually every girl he meets. The opening scene is set on W2 class tram 260, on Route 64, East Brighton, from Glenhuntly tram depot, travelling towards the City. We see Alvin as a passenger who dreams about seeing all the young female passengers in the nude, or as sex objects.
 The 1953 British comedy Genevieve, starring John Gregson and Kenneth More, tells the story of the London to Brighton Veteran Car Run. Although they're not supposed to do so, Gregson and More's characters challenge each other to a race from Brighton, to see who is the first to cross Westminster Bridge in London. After many incidents, More is leading the race, but the tyres of his car get stuck in the tram tracks and he is led in the wrong direction, meaning that Gregson (the film's hero) wins the race. (The London tram system closed in 1952, but the tracks were still down when the film was made later that same year, for release in 1953.)
 Luis Buñuel filmed La Ilusión viaja en tranvía (English: Illusion Travels by Streetcar) in Mexico in 1953.
 In Akira Kurosawa's film Dodesukaden a mentally ill boy pretends to be a tram conductor.
 Tramvaj (Tram) is an eight-minute, 2012 Czech short animated film directed by Michaela Pavlátová.
 The Herbie films are a series about a Volkswagen named Herbie. The second film, Herbie Rides Again, has tram 27 living in the garden, near to Herbie. 27 plays a major part in the plot of the film.

Literature
 One of the earliest literary references to trams occurs on the second page of Henry James's novel The Europeans:

 Published in 1878, the novel is set in the 1840s, though horse trams were not introduced in Boston till the 1850s. Note how the tram's efficiency surprises the European visitor; how two "remarkably small" horses sufficed to draw the "huge" tramcar.
 Joseph Conrad described Amsterdam's trams in chapter 14 of The Mirror of the Sea (1906): "From afar at the end of Tsar Peter Straat, issued in the frosty air the tinkle of bells of the horse tramcars, appearing and disappearing in the opening between the buildings, like little toy carriages harnessed with toy horses and played with by people that appeared no bigger than children."
 In episode 6 ("Hades") of James Joyce's Ulysses (1918), the party on the way to Paddy Dignam's funeral in a horse-drawn carriage idly debates the merits of various tramway improvements:

 Joyce appreciated the fact that public investment in trams benefits local property owners. In the fourth chapter of Ulysses, entitled Calypso, Bloom speculates that if Dublin Corporation were to build a tramline along the street, property values would "go up like a shot" 

 The Moscow tramway figures prominently at the beginning of Mikhail Bulgakov's novel The Master and Margarita, which was written between 1928 and 1940. In chapter 1 Satan/Professor Woland announces that Berlioz will die that evening because Anna has spilt sunflower oil, and indeed at the end of chapter 3 Berlioz slips on the tramway tracks and is decapitated.
 Danzig trams figure extensively in the early stages of Günter Grass's Die Blechtrommel (The Tin Drum). In the last chapter the novel's hero Oskar Matzerath and his friend Gottfried von Vittlar steal a tram late at night from outside Unterrath depot on the northern edge of Düsseldorf. In a surreal journey, von Vittlar drives the tram through the night, south to Flingern and Haniel and then east to the suburb of Gerresheim.
 In his 1967 spy thriller An Expensive Place to Die, Len Deighton misidentifies the Flemish coast tram: "The red glow of Ostend is nearer now and yellow trains rattle alongside the motor road and over the bridge by the Royal Yacht Club...". 
 In the third of his Thomas Kell novels, A Divided Spy, Charles Cumming has a hitman arrive on a tram to commit a murder on the Gdansk Bridge in Warsaw.
 The Rev W. Awdry wrote about GER Class C53 called Toby the Tram Engine, which starred in his The Railway Series with his faithful coach, Henrietta.
 In Haruki Murakami's novel Norwegian Wood, protagonist Toru Watanabe takes Tokyo's only surviving tramline, the Toden Arakawa Line, to near Ōtsuka Station: "I sat in the last seat and watched the ancient houses passing close to the window. The tram almost touched the overhanging eaves.... The tram snaked its way through this private back-alley world."
 Agatha Christie (1890-1976) was a rail and tram enthusiast with many of her mysteries being set on trains.  She had her first work published when she was a child; it was a poem about attitudes in her home town of Torquay to public transport, and it commenced with the following lines:

Andrew Martin's 2004 'steam detective' novel The Blackpool Highflyer makes repeated mention of Halifax and Blackpool trams, and even the gas tram to St Annes.

Music

 "The Trolley Song" in the film Meet Me in St. Louis received an Academy Award nomination.
 In 2009 Thomas Haggerty composed and produced 'Tram' generations 1, 2 and 3 for the Slowcore/Indie Rock group, Tram.
 Tram 11, the first hip hop group from Zagreb, is named after the tram line connecting the two rappers' neighborhoods.

Opera
 In 1995, an opera derived from the drama A Streetcar Named Desire was first produced.

Television

 The US children's TV show Mister Rogers' Neighborhood features a trolley (tram). It is shown on National Educational Television, PBS, Sprout and the Canadian Broadcasting Corporation.
 Trams feature in the opening titles of the world's longest running TV soap opera Coronation Street, set in the fictional Manchester suburb of Weatherfield, and produced by Granada Television. A Blackpool tram killed one of the main characters in 1989. Then for the 50th anniversary celebrations in 2010, the show featured a major stunt involving a tram (modelled on the Manchester Metrolink) careering off a viaduct into the street in the now nicknamed “Tram Crash” storyline. 
 A derelict Miskolc tram features as the plaything of a gang of children in the 1975 cult Hungarian television series Utánam, srácok! (After me, guys!).

Visual arts
 Tramway is a contemporary visual and performing arts venue located in the Scottish city of Glasgow. Based in the former Coplawill Glasgow Corporation Tramways depot in the Pollokshields area of the South Side, it consists of two performance spaces and two galleries, as well as offering facilities for community and artistic projects. It is claimed to be one of the leading venues of its type in Europe.
It was financed by the Victorian state government, and painted by Harold Freedman. It features all forms of transport used in Victoria from 1835 to 1978, with trams featuring prominently. A horizontal column of trams shows the progression of vehicle design, with some dozens of trams being illustrated. In 2000, during a revamp and renaming of the station to Southern Cross railway station, part of the mural was removed. It was taken down completely in 2005 and, after a cleaning, was in 2007 relocated to Spencer Outlet Centre, adjoining the railway station. Freedman painted the mural over a number of years, in a former electric sub-station cited on railway land to the north of East Camberwell railway station.
 A sculpture of tram 1040, the last numbered of Melbourne's iconic "W"-class trams was unveiled at the corner of Flinders and Spencer Streets, Melbourne, in October 2013. The sculpture is the work of local artist David Ball. It can be viewed from a number of tram routes, and is just one block from Southern Cross railway station.

Other
 Toonerville Folks comic strip (1908–55) by Fontaine Fox featured the "Toonerville Trolley that met all the trains".
 The predominance of trams (trolleys) in the borough of Brooklyn in New York City gave rise to the disparaging term trolley dodger for residents of the borough. That term, shortened to "Dodger" became the nickname for the Brooklyn Dodgers (now the Los Angeles Dodgers).
 A representation of a Melbourne W-type tram featured at the opening ceremony of the 2006 Commonwealth Games in Melbourne. A model of the "flying tram" (as it was dubbed) is now exhibited at the Melbourne Museum.
 Tramway, North Carolina, is an area of Lee County, North Carolina which politically forms part of Sanford.

References

Topics in popular culture
public transport
Sustainable transport
Russian inventions
 
Road hazards